André Jung (born 13 December 1953) is a Luxembourgish theatre and film actor. He studied performing arts at the State University of Music and Performing Arts Stuttgart and subsequently worked at various theatres, including the Theater Basel, the Deutsches Schauspielhaus in Hamburg, and the Schauspielhaus Zürich.

Selected filmography

Awards
 Nestroy Prize (2009)
 Gertrud-Eysoldt-Ring (2018)

References

External links
 

1953 births
Living people
Male stage actors
Luxembourgian male film actors
Luxembourgian male actors